Oluwarotimi Adebiyi Wahab Fani-Kayode (20 April 1955 – 21 December 1989) was a Nigerian-born photographer, who moved to England at the age of 12 to escape the Nigerian Civil War. The main body of his work was created between 1982 and 1989. He explored the tensions created by sexuality, race and culture through stylised portraits and compositions.

Biography
Rotimi Fani-Kayode was born in Lagos, Nigeria, in April 1955, as the second child of a prominent Yoruba family (Chief Babaremilekun Adetokunboh Fani-Kayode and Chief Mrs. Adia Adunni Fani-Kayode) that moved to Brighton, England, in 1966, after the military coup and the ensuing civil war. Rotimi went to a number of British private schools for his secondary education, including Brighton College, Seabright College, and Millfield, then moved to the USA in 1976. He read Fine Arts and Economics at Georgetown University, Washington, DC, for his BA, continued on for his MFA in Fine Arts & Photography at the Pratt Institute, New York City. While in New York, he became friendly with Robert Mapplethorpe, who he has claimed as an influence on his work.

Fani-Kayode returned to the UK in 1983 where he became a member of the Brixton Artists Collective, exhibiting initially in some of the group shows held at the Brixton Art Gallery before going on to show at various other exhibition spaces in London. He died in hospital of a heart attack while recovering from an AIDS-related illness on 21 December 1989. At the time of his death, he was living in Brixton, London, with his life partner and collaborator Alex Hirst.

Work
Fani-Kayode admitted to being influenced by Mapplethorpe's earlier work but also pushed the bounds of his own art, exploring sexuality, racism, colonialism and the tensions and conflicts between his homosexuality and his Yoruba upbringing through a series of images in both colour and black and white. While Rotimi Fani-Kayode claimed Robert Mapplethorpe as an influence on his work, Fani-Kayode works with Baroque themes while Mapplethorpe worked with Classical.

His relationship with the Yoruba religion began with his parents. Fani-Kayode stated that his parents were devotees of Ifa, the oracle orisha, and keepers of Yoruba shrines, an early experience that definitely informed his work. With this legacy, he set out on the quest to fuse desire, ritual, and the black male body. His religious experiences encouraged him to emulate the Yoruba technique of possession, through which Yoruba priests communicate with the gods and experience ecstasy. An example of such relations between Fani-Kayode's photographs and the Yoruba 'technique of ecstasy" is displayed in his work, Bronze Head (1987). His goal was to communicate with the audience's unconscious mind and to combine Yoruba and Western ideals (specifically Christianity). This practice of fusing aesthetic and religious eroticism compelled the viewer visually and provocatively.

This can be seen in his early work, specifically "Sonponnoi" (1987). Sonponnoi is one of the most powerful orishas in the Yoruba pantheon; he is the god of smallpox. As a result of his great power, he induces fear to the point where people are afraid to speak his name, and he becomes an outsider, abiding in the countryside instead of the mainland. In the image there is a headless black figure, decorated in white and black spots, holding three burning candles on his groin. Fani-Kayode adorned the figure with spots to represent a Sonponnoi's smallpox and Yoruba tribal marks. The triple-burning candle on his groin evokes the sense that sexuality continues even in sickness/otherness. It also represents how the Christian faith replaced the Yoruba tradition while also bringing disease with it during colonialism. In a way, Fani-Kayode identified with this orisha being an outsider, but he extended the symbolic message of the image, speaking to him having condemned sexuality while living in a Western world that clashes with his ancestral religion.

He especially referenced Esu, the messenger and crossroads deity who is often characterised with an erect penis, frequently in his images. He would engrave an erect penis in many of his images to describe his own fluid experience with sexuality. Fani-Kayode's mid-1980s portfolio ''Black Male, White Male'' intersects his racial and sexual themes with subtle displays of a devotee-deity relationship. Much of that work expresses an ambiguity that can be associated with Esu, who embodies opposing forces. Speaking on Esu, he insists, "Eshu presides here [...] He is the Trickster, the Lord of the Crossroads (mediator between the genders), sometimes changing the signposts to lead us astray [...] It is perhaps through that rebirth will occur." Esu also appears in Fani-Kayode's photography, Nothing to Lose IX. The presence of Esu is understood in the colouring of the mask; using white, red, and black stripes the mask stands as a representation of the deity Esu. Although these colours symbolise Esu, the mask itself has no precedence in traditional African mask-making; this subtle theme is almost flattening the mask to represent an overarching "African-ness" (a critique of the notion of "primitiveness" that was widely digested by a European audience).

Fani-Kayode's fragmented sense of being can be examined in his 1987 ''Bronze Head''. In the photo, he crops a figure's black body to reveal his legs and butt as he is about to sit on top of a bronze Ife sculpture. The Ife sculpture is placed on a round platter, stool, or pedestal, and is placed strategically at the center of the picture frame. Typically, the bronze head in the photograph is meant to honor the Ife king. However, in the context of Fani-Kayode's photograph, it satirizes the Yoruba kingship institution. The photograph represents both his exile and homosexuality, two core parts of his world. The cropped body symbolises his fragmented identity, the position references his sexuality and the sculpture symbolises the ancient and lifelong social norms that he's attempting to deconstruct.

His last project, posthumously entitled "Communion" (1995), reflects his complex relationship with the Yoruba religion. It seems to emit the Yoruba concepts of coolness and power. He reflects that it is a "tranquility of communion with the spiritual world." One of the images in the series, "The Golden Phallus," is of a man with a bird-like mask looking at the viewer, with his penis suspended on a piece of string. The image has been described as an ironic representation of how black masculinity has been burdened by the Western world. In this image (The Golden Phallus), as in Fani-Kayode's Bronze Head, there is a focus on liminality, spirituality, political power, and cultural history—taking ideals seen as 'ancient' (in the display of 'classical' African art) and re-introducing them as a contemporary archetype.

Legacy
Fani-Kayode and many others considered him to be an outsider and a depiction of diaspora. Fani-Kayode, however, believed that due to this depiction of himself, it helped shape his work as a photographer. In interviews, he spoke on his experience of being an outsider in terms of the African diaspora, but it's also important to note that it was forced migration. His exile from Nigeria at an early age affected his sense of wholeness. He experienced feeling like he had "very little to lose." But his identity was then shaped from his sense of otherness and it was celebrated. In his work, Fani-Kayode's subjects are specifically black men, but he almost always asserts himself as the black man in most of his work, which can be interpreted as a performative and visual representation of his personal history. Describing his art as "Black, African, homosexual photography"Using the body as the centralized point in his photography, he was able to explore the relationship between erotic fantasy and his ancestral spiritual values. His complex experience of dislocation, fragmentation, rejection, and separation all shaped his work. Fani-Kayode challenged the invisibility of "African queerness", or the denial of alternative African sexualities, in both the 

Western and African worlds. In general, he sought to reshape the ideas of sexuality and gender in his photography, showing that sexuality and gender appear rigid and "fixed" because of cultural and social norms but are actually fluid and subjective. However, he specifically sought to develop queerness in contemporary African art, which required him to address the colonial and Christian legacies that suppressed queerness and constructed harmful notions of black masculinity. In a time when African artists were not being represented, he provocatively approached the issue by addressing and questioning the objectification of black bodies. (charlotte) His homoerotic influences in using the black male body can be interpreted as an expression of idealisation, of desire and being desired, and self-consciousness in response to the black body being reduced to a spectacle. He was able to show the world and those in the art world just how much queer black voices matter. Telling their sides of the story and not just being the subject of someone else's depiction of them. 

Not only is Fani-Kayode praised for his conceptual imagery of Africanness and queerness (and African queerness), he is also praised for his ability to fuse racial and sexual politics with religious eroticism and beauty. One critic has also described his work as "neo-romantic," with the idea his images evoke a sense of fleeting beauty.

His work is imbued with subtlety, irony, and political and social comment. He also contributed to the artistic debate surrounding HIV/AIDS.

Exhibitions

He started to exhibit in 1984 and had taken part in numerous exhibitions by the time of his death in 1989. His work has been exhibited in the United Kingdom, France, Austria, Italy, Nigeria, Sweden, Germany, South Africa, and the US.

Fani-Kayode first exhibited at the large gallery run by the Brixton Artists Collective. He exhibited in three group shows at the Gallery: No Comment, December 1984; Seeing Diversity, February 1985 and the Annual Members Show, November 1985.
Same Difference, group show at Camerawork, July 1986
The Invisible Man, group show at Goldsmith's Gallery, 1988
ÁBÍKU - Born to Die, one-person show at Centre 181 Gallery (Hammersmith), September/October 1988
US/UK Photography Exchange, touring group show at Camerawork & Jamaica Arts Centre, New York, 1989
Ecstatic Antibodies: Resisting the AIDS Mythology, Touring group exhibition, Curated by Sunil Gupta and Tessa Boffin, 1990, Impressions Gallery, York; Ikon Gallery, Birmingham; Battersea Arts Centre, London.

In 1988, Fani-Kayode with a number of other photographers (most of whom had come together for Reflections of the Black Experience, Brixton Artists Collective) —including Sunil Gupta, Monika Baker, Merle Van den Bosch, Pratibha Parmar, Ingrid Pollard, Roshini Kempadoo and Armet Francis—co-founded the Association of Black Photographers (now known as Autograph ABP) and became their first chair. He was also an active member of the Black Audio Film Collective. He was a major influence on young black photographers in the late 1980s and 1990s. Following Alex Hirst's death in 1992, some controversy has persisted about works attributed to Fani-Kayode.

Publications
Communion. London: Autograph, 1986.
Black Male/White Male. London: Gay Men's Press, 1988. Photographs by Fani-Kayode, text by Alex Hirst.
 Bodies of Experience: Stories about Living with HIV. - a group show at Camerawork in 1989
 Autoportraits. Camerawork RF-K March 1990 (He was included in the publicity for the exhibition but work was not shown due to his sudden death in December 1989).
 Memorial Retrospective Exhibition. 198 Gallery, December 1990  (Brian Kennedy, City Limits magazine, makes a request for donations to fund the exhibition.) Poster-catalogue essays by Alex Hirst and Stuart Hall.
Photographs. Autograph ABP, London, 1996. By Fani-Kayode and Alex Hirst.
 Decolonising the Camera by Mark Sealy pages 226-232.
 And Bloodflowers: Rotimi Fani-Kayode, Photography and the 1980s. by W Ian Bourland.

Quotes
"My identity has been constructed from my own sense of otherness, whether cultural, racial, or sexual. The three aspects are not separate within me. Photography is the tool by which I feel most confident in expressing myself. It is photography, therefore – Black, African, homosexual photography – which I must use not just as an instrument, but as a weapon if I am to resist attacks on my integrity and, indeed, my existence on my own terms."

"On three counts I am an outsider: in matters of sexuality; in terms of geographical and cultural dislocation; and in the sense of not having become the sort of respectably married professional my parents might have hoped for."

"I make my pictures homosexual on purpose. Black men from the Third World have not previously revealed either to their own peoples or to the West a certain shocking fact: they can desire each other."

"I try to bring out the spiritual dimension in my pictures so that concepts of reality become ambiguous and are open to reinterpretation. This requires what Yoruba priests call a technique of ecstasy."

References

1955 births
1989 deaths
Artists from Lagos
Black British artists
Rotimi
Gay photographers
Georgetown University alumni
British LGBT photographers
LGBT Black British people
Nigerian LGBT artists
British gay artists
Nigerian emigrants to the United Kingdom
People educated at Brighton College
People educated at Millfield
Pratt Institute alumni
Yoruba photographers
20th-century Nigerian LGBT people
20th-century British LGBT people
20th-century photographers
Nigerian photographers
20th-century Nigerian artists
AIDS-related deaths in the United Kingdom
HIV/AIDS activists